Activision Anthology is a compilation of most of the Atari 2600 games by Activision for various game systems. It also includes games that were originally released by Absolute Entertainment and Imagic, as well as various homebrew games. The Microsoft Windows and Mac OS X versions are titled Activision Anthology: Remix Edition, and include the most games. The PlayStation Portable version is titled Activision Hits Remixed.

The game features the original gameplay of the Atari 2600 emulated on modern systems. After achieving high scores in some of the games, the player can unlock special modes where the colors are distorted, or the game is projected on a rotating cube as added difficulty.

Activision Anthology uses a virtual child's bedroom as the main menu. The player can select several viewpoints to check high scores, choose a video game cartridge from a rotating stand, change the background music on a virtual tape deck, or change game settings while being zoomed in on a virtual Atari 2600. The virtual tape deck features several licensed 1980s music tracks. The music from the virtual tape deck can be mixed with the Atari 2600 game audio so both are audible to simulate playing the game on TV while having the tape running in the background.

Six Activision-produced Atari 2600 titles were not included in Activision Anthology, likely due to outside ownership of their respective licenses. The excluded games are Commando, Double Dragon, Ghostbusters, Ghostbusters II, Kung Fu Master, and Rampage, although Capcom did give Activision rights to put Commando in the PlayStation 2, Windows, and Mac OS X versions of Activision Anthology. Ghostbusters II was cancelled before Activision could release it, but Salu released it in Europe under their name in 1992. The Absolute Entertainment title Pete Rose Baseball was renamed Baseball.

Portable versions
The Game Boy Advance version has the most games out of the portable versions, including seven homebrew games that do not appear in any of the other versions. It does not include the 19 Imagic games or Commando, nor does it play music during gameplay. It does have four custom 1980s-style music tracks that play in the menu screens, however.

The PlayStation Portable version includes three of the Imagic games, Atlantis, Demon Attack, and Moonsweeper, nearly all of the Activision games, full-speed emulation, and the 1980s songs featured in the PlayStation 2 and computer versions, but does not include Commando, the four Absolute Entertainment games, games exclusive to the other releases, or the homebrew titles. The PSP version also lacked the possibility to save high scores and unlocked extras, so when the player quits out of the game, all progress would be lost.

There was also a version released on mobile phones with three titles. It included H.E.R.O., Pitfall!, and River Raid.

A version for the digiBlast was released on December 31, 2005, which included 5 titles. These titles are H.E.R.O., Tennis, Megamania, Grand Prix, and Demon Attack.

Activision Anthology was released for Android and iOS devices on August 30, 2012. The game Kaboom! is offered as an initial free game, while the rest of the games were offered as an in-app purchase. These versions include the Imagic game Dragonfire, but do not include the homebrew games, the games by Absolute Entertainment, or Commando. These versions also do not contain any of the licensed 1980s music.

Game list
There are a total of 76 games in each version combined. Certain games do not appear in some versions and are mentioned accordingly.

Reviews
GameSpot – 7.3/10
GameSpy – 80/100
Gaming Age – B−
Gaming Target – 8.5/10
IGN – 8.5/10

The game received generally positive reviews and was mainly praised on the Internet because of its spirited homage to the Atari 2600.

Notes

References

External links
Official PSP version website
 
 http://ps2.ign.com/objects/491/491542.html IGN's page of the game
 Activision Anthology review at IGN

2002 video games
Activision video game compilations
Android (operating system) games
Aspyr games
Atari 2600
Barking Lizards games
Code Mystics games
Digital Eclipse games
Game Boy Advance games
IOS games
MacOS games
Multiplayer and single-player video games
PlayStation 2 games
PlayStation Portable games
Video games developed in the United States
Video games scored by Alexander Brandon
Windows games
MumboJumbo games